Ghantasala Sai Srinivas Thaman (born 16 November 1983), known professionally as Thaman S, earlier as S S Thaman, is an Indian music composer, professional drummer, and playback singer who predominantly works in Telugu films, Kannada cinema and Tamil films. Thaman entered the film industry as a supporting musician with the Telugu film Bhairava Dweepam in 1994, and later became a film music composer. His debut films as music director were Malli Malli (2009) in Telugu and Sindhanai Sei (2009) in Tamil. He made his acting debut in Boys (2003).

His breakout film as a music director was Kick (2009). His notable compositions include films such as Eeram (2009), Brindavanam (2010), Mirapakay (2011), Dookudu (2011), Businessman (2012), Naayak (2013), Baadshah (2013), Greeku Veerudu (2013), Race Gurram (2014), Aagadu (2014), Bruce Lee (2015), Sarrainodu (2016), Tholi Prema (2018), Simmba (2018), Ala Vaikuntapuramulo (2020), Krack (2021), Vakeel Saab (2021), Akhanda (2021), Bheemla Nayak (2022) and Varisu (2023). He won the National Film Award for Best Music Direction for Ala Vaikuntapuramulo and Filmfare Award for Best Music Director – Telugu for Dookudu.

Early life
Thaman was born as Ghantasala Sai Srinivas in Madras, Tamil Nadu into a Telugu-speaking family of musicians, who hail from Potepalem in Nellore district, Andhra Pradesh. He is the grandson of veteran director and producer, Ghantasala Balaramayya. His father, Ghantasala Siva Kumar, was a drummer, who worked for seven hundred films, under music director K. Chakravarthy. His mother, Ghantasala Savitri, his sister, Yamini Ghantasala, and his aunt, B. Vasantha, are all playback singers. Sai Srinivas adopted the stage name Thaman and suffixed it with an S, the initial of his father's name Sivakumar.

Thaman studied at Boston School in Chennai. He joined a music team consisting of S. P. Balasubrahmanyam and G. Anand as a rhythm pads player when he was nine years old, and discontinued studies when he lost his father at the age of 13. He was compelled to make his hobby into a profession to overcome the crisis in his family. He then joined Raj–Koti and worked for three years on 60 films under their tutelage. He also worked with M. M. Keeravani for three years on 30 films.

Thaman considers Mani Sharma to be his guru and spent eight years under his tutelage, while working on 94 films with him. On the whole he put in fourteen years of rhythm and keyboard programming with the veterans before branching out on his own.

Career 
Thaman made his debut as a composer in through the Telugu feature film Malli Malli (2009), although the soundtrack album was released in 2008. Jeevi of Idlebrain credited Thaman's work in the film is credited as "good". The same year his second soundtrack, of the film Sindhanai Sei, marked his debut in the Tamil cinema. He has also made his playback singing debut by recording "Uchimeedhu" song from the soundtrack. A critic rated the album 2 out of 5 and stated, "The music itself is rather dramatic, and sometimes strident. Almost all the songs, barring one seem to be pitched on the 6-kattai scale, which does not afford much variety in terms of listening". A Telugu version of the album was released for the film's dubbed Telugu version. Background score in the Tamil film Eeram (2009) received good reviews from the critics. Although he started composing the music of the film in 2007, the soundtrack was released in 2008 and eventually the film was released in 2009.

Although Thaman got his major success with the album of the film Kick (2009), critics gave mixed reviews citing it as "mediocre". In the same year, he has four more soundtrack album releases–three in Telugu and one in Tamil. Composition of "Mahalakshmi" and "Dhakku Dhakku" songs from the film Sankham were praised. In 2010, he has composed score and soundtrack album for nine films, with majority of them being Tamil. Brindavanam was the most successful composition of all. Released on 12 September 2010, the album received positive reviews. 123Telugu gave a review stating "Overall the songs of Brindaavanam are fast, most of them soulful, enjoyable and a touch catering to the lovers of mass numbers. Most Telugu music directors have been going the Rahman way focusing on a fast beat while the song is slow. This album is an exception, where the songs are as fast as they can get. Thaman manages to keep everyone interested with his tunes, in spite of the pressure to cater to dance needs of Jr.NTR."

In May 2017, Thaman made his Hindi debut when he was one of the six composers who featured in the soundtrack album of Rohit Shetty's Golmaal Again, a comedy franchise in Hindi cinema. In 2018, he composed a theme song for Rohit Shetty's successful venture Simmba.

Thaman is working as a Judge for Telugu Indian Idol, which is streaming on Aha.

Personal life 
Thaman is married to playback singer Sri Vardhini and they have a 16 year old son named Achyuth. He owns music bands named Band Thamania and Gongura band.

Discography

As composer

Original soundtracks

As playback singer

Music videos

Filmography

Television

Accolades

National Film Awards
2022: 68th National Film Awards – Best Music Direction for Ala Vaikunthapurramuloo

South Indian International Movie Awards
2012: SIIMA Award for Best Music Director (Telugu) for Dookudu
2013: SIIMA Award for Best Male Playback Singer (Telugu) for "Sir Osthara" – Businessman
2015: SIIMA Award for Most streaming song for "Aagadu title song" – Aagadu
2021: SIIMA Award for Best Music Director (Telugu) for Ala Vaikunthapurramuloo
2022: SIIMA Award for Best Male Playback Singer (Kannada) for Yuvarathnaa

Filmfare Awards South
2012: Filmfare Award for Best Music Director – Telugu for Dookudu

Other awards
The Hyderabad Times Film Awards 2011 – Best Music Director for Dookudu
MAA Music Awards 2011 – Best Music Director for Dookudu
TSR TV9 Awards 2011 – Best Music Director for Dookudu. 
TSR TV9 Awards 2016 – Best Music Director for Sarrainodu, Srirastu Subhamastu.
GAMA Awards 2016 – Best Love song "Nuvve Nuvve" in Kick 2.
Zee Cine Awards Telugu – Favorite Music Director for Tholi Prema.
17th Santosham Film Awards 2019 – Best Music Director Award for Aravinda Sametha Veera Raghava (2018).

References

External links
 
 
 

Indian male playback singers
Telugu film score composers
Telugu playback singers
Filmfare Awards South winners
Living people
Tamil film score composers
1983 births
Indian male composers
Film musicians from Andhra Pradesh
21st-century Indian composers
Male film score composers
21st-century Indian male singers
21st-century Indian singers
South Indian International Movie Awards winners
Santosham Film Awards winners
Zee Cine Awards Telugu winners
Telugu Indian Idol
Best Music Direction National Film Award winners